A Retrospective is a European Lou Reed compilation.

Track listing
 "I Can't Stand It"  
 "Walk on the Wild Side"  
 "Satellite of Love"  
 "Vicious"  
 "Caroline Says I"  
 "Sweet Jane" [Live]  
 "Kill Your Sons"  
 "Coney Island Baby"  
 "Nowhere at All"
 "Blue Mask"
 "Legendary Hearts"
 "My Red Joystick"
 "Original Wrapper"
 "Video Violence"

Lou Reed compilation albums
1998 compilation albums